Morpeth Rugby Football Club is an English rugby union club based in Morpeth, Northumberland. The 1st XV team currently plays in North 1 East, having previously reached the national levels of the sport for the first time in 2019–20. The club operates 4 Senior Men's sides and Colts regularly playing each weekend, plus 'Morpeth Ranters' Vets, a Senior Ladies team and 3 Girls rugby squads, as well as a Minis/Junior rugby setup with teams ranging from U6 > U16.

History

Morpeth RFC were founded in 1947.  The club was originally formed as The Old Edwardians RFC on 28 June 1947 as a junior member of Northumberland RFU. However, on 5 May 1950 it was renamed Morpeth Old Edwardians, to differentiate from another Club with the same name in Birmingham. The early years of the club were relatively low-key but on 14 May 1954 it achieved senior playing status in Northumberland, then in 1958 they reached the final of the Northumberland Senior Cup for the very first time, losing 3–9 to Percy Park in a tight game. The club was finally renamed Morpeth Rugby Football Club on 20 June 1970. They would reach 4 more county cup finals during the 1960s and 1970s but would come up short in each, although the 1974 defeat against Gosforth would set them up for one of the all-time great national cup runs.  This occurred during the 1974–75 John Player Cup, when a remarkable sequence of giant-killing victories took  Morpeth to within 80 minutes of the John Player Cup final at Twickenham Stadium. In the qualifying round, Morpeth defeated Netherall Old Boys. In the first round, Morpeth beat Stockswood Park 10–0 at Mitford Road. In the second round, Morpeth defeated London Irish 19-3 again at Mitford road. In the quarter final Morpeth, beat Bath 9–13 at the Recreation Ground. In the semi final, Morpeth finally lost at home against Rosslyn Park 6-28.  In 1998, after seven previous finals without a win, Morpeth finally won the Northumberland Senior Cup, defeating Tynedale 21–13, on what was the 50th anniversary of the club.

Morpeth's league rugby started in North 1 East and in the 1996–97 season won the League and were promoted to North 2. In the 2000–01 season they were placed into North 1 East after the Leagues were split East & West, where they stayed until they suffered relegation at the end of the 2013–14 season.  Their stay in Durham/Northumberland 1 was a short one, as although they finished second in the league to Guisborough, they defeated Yorkshire 1 runners up Malton & Norton 14–11 at home to clinch promotion back to North 1 East.  At the end of the 2018–19 season Morpeth finished as champions of North 1 East, reaching North Premier, which at level 5 is the highest level the club have reached since the leagues began back in 1987. The 2019–20 season was cut short due to the COVID-19 pandemic and Morpeth were relegated, back to North 1 East, when a % points system for games played was brought in with 4 League matches still left to play.

Toby Flood (future England International) played 8 games & scored 83 points for Morpeth at the start of his rugby career in 2003–04 season. He actually played his last game for Morpeth v Hull on 22nd Nov 2003, the same day England beat Australia to win the 2003 Rugby World Cup!

Ground

Morpeth RFC play at Grange House Field on Mitford Road, situated next to Newminster Middle School in the north-west of Morpeth, adjacent to the River Wansbeck.  The ground consists of a clubhouse and 3 grass pitches (1 floodlit).  The club-house has two function rooms, both equipped with bars, capable of hosting up to 250 people, altogether.  Capacity around the main pitch is approximately 1,000, all of which is standing.  There is parking available at the ground, and Morpeth railway station is just over 1 mile walk away.

As well as hosting club games, the ground has also been used by Northumberland for the County Championships.

Club honours
Northumberland Senior Cup winners (5): 1998, 2002, 2007, 2016, 2020
North 1 East champions: 2018-19
North East 1 champions: 1996–97
Durham/Northumberland 1 promotion play-off winners: 2014–15

References

14. 
'The twelve	
- 
year 
- 
old journalist and the lost days of 
rugby'
By John Inverdale	
26 September 2001 • 5:34pm	
– 
Telegraph

TOM GREEN is 12. A real	
- 
life Harry Potter if you will. Except for him it's not quidditch but rugby, and 
week 
- 
in week 
- 
out, you'll find 	
him on the touchline at Morpeth in the glorious Northumbria 
countryside, making notes on his club's exploits in Northern Division North East Two (another of 
those snappy league titles).
Because with his match reports appearing each week in the 	
Morpeth Herald, Tom must be the 
youngest rugby correspondent in Britain. And given the fact that the side include in their ranks the 
one and only Duncan Hutton, a former world champion in Cumberland wrestling, he'd better get his 
facts right. "I try to rep	
ort the positive things, even when they lose," he says wisely. How Graham 
Henry must have wished he'd been on the Lions' tour.
Ten days ago, Tom and 100 other hardy souls watched Morpeth lose to up	
- 
and 
- 
coming Bedford 
Athletic in the first round of the Nati	
onal Knockout Cup 	
- 
one of  
two major competitions that are still 
without a sponsor three weeks into the new season (and doesn't	
the continued lack of a maj	
or 
backer for the National Leagues	
beggar belief?)
However, the fact that the names of John Player, Pilkington and Tetley have departed the scene, 
leaving the competition unsullied by commercial branding, recalls those	
early days of the event 
when many in 	
the game thought a cup competition of any description was contrary to the ethos of 
rugby football.
Now back in those 	
long 
- 
lost 
days of 1974	
- 
75, who should have reached the semi	
- 
final of the National 
Knockout Cup, beating London Irish and Bath (at the Rec) 	
among others on the way, but Morpeth. It 
remains one of rugby's great trivia questions: name the four semi	
- 
finalists that season. Well, go on 
then.
Two Saturdays 	
ago, 
may have been a far cry from those heady days, but for all concerned it was a 
relief to s 
ee the team playing at all. From Feb 7 until the end of last season, Morpeth RFC shut down 
because of the foot	
- 
and 
- 
mouth epidemic. Not a single match. No revenue. No nothing.
Half the first XV are farmers, and they weren't allowed off their land at the hei	
ght of the crisis. 
According to Bill Hewitt, who proudly lays claim to having played across five decades, it would have 
ripped the heart out of many a lesser club, but Morpeth have returned to the fray stronger and re	
-
vitalised, and an integral part once a	
gain of the local community. "And we're obviously enormously 
grateful to the RFU for the £1,000 compensation they sent us," he says, with a wry smile.
The bar takings will help a bit this weekend with a league game against local rivals Westoe. Tom 
Green's  
match report will be there for all to see next week, and then, via Morpeth under	
- 
13s, he 
hopes to be a professional player one day with Newcastle Falcons. For him and his pals,	
Jonny 
Wilkinson is as much a hero	
as Alan Shearer to the embryonic Toon Army just a dozen miles down 
the road. This journalistic lark is just a 	
side 
- 
line 
you see. Second best if all else fails. "Anyone can 
write but not everyone can	
play,"  
said the rugby correspondent of the Morpeth Herald.

External links
Official club website

English rugby union teams
Rugby union clubs in Northumberland
Sports clubs in England